"All the Kids Are Right" is a song by American alternative rock band Local H. The song was released as the lead single from the group's third studio album Pack Up the Cats.

Overview
Despite being released around the time PolyGram (the parent label of Island Records) was merging with Universal Music Group, the song went on to become the group's second most successful single. "All the Kids Are Right" charted on both the US Mod. and US Main. charts, staying there for 13 weeks and 12 weeks, respectively.

Track listing

Charts

Personnel
 Scott Lucas – vocals, guitar, bass
 Joe Daniels – drums

References

1998 songs
1998 singles
Local H songs
Island Records singles
Song recordings produced by Roy Thomas Baker
Music videos directed by Phil Harder